The following is a list of people executed by the U.S. state of Texas between 1880 and 1889. During this period 64 people were executed by hanging.

Executions 1880–1889

See also
Capital punishment in Texas

References

1880
19th-century executions by Texas
1880s-related lists
1880s in Texas